Tiverikoto (Tivericoto) is an extinct and poorly attested Cariban language. Terrence Kaufman placed it with Yao in his Yao group.

References

Cariban languages
Extinct languages